3x3 basketball competition at the 2016 Asian Beach Games was held in Da Nang, Vietnam from 26 to 29 September 2016 at Biển Đông Park.

Medalists

Medal table

Results

Men

Preliminary round

Group A

Group B

Knockout round

Quarterfinals

Semifinals

Bronze medal game

Gold medal game

Women

Preliminary round

Group A

Group B

Knockout round

Quarterfinals

Semifinals

Bronze medal game

Gold medal game

References

External links
Official website
Official Result Book – 3x3 Basketball

2016
basketball
Beach Games
2016–17 in Vietnamese basketball
International basketball competitions hosted by Vietnam
2016 in 3x3 basketball